The Fenton Wind Farm is a 205.5 megawatt wind energy project built by enXco (now EDF Renewables), that became operational in the second half of 2007. The $385-million project is near Chandler, Minnesota, United States, on a site that encompasses Murray and Nobles counties and consists of 137 GE 1.5 MW wind turbines.

Power generated by the Fenton Wind Energy project will be sold to Northern States Power, a subsidiary of Minneapolis-based Xcel Energy.

The land was and is subject to archeological surveys as it is situated in a culturally sensitive area previously inhabited by the Dakota.

Project history

Apr 2006 - Permit issued

Jan 2007 - Financing of project secured

Sep 2007 - Construction begins

Oct 2007 - Scheduled completion

See also

Wind farm
Wind power in the United States

References

External links

 Fenton Wind Farm

Buildings and structures in Murray County, Minnesota
Buildings and structures in Nobles County, Minnesota
Energy infrastructure completed in 2007
Wind farms in Minnesota